Perfect English is the second blackly comic novel by British writer Paul Pickering. It is based on his own experience as an "Internationalista" in the war in Nicaragua against the Contras. The novel was long-listed for the Booker Prize and received very favourable reviews.

Pickering was for a while under siege in the Nicaraguan town of Bluefields, where he helped former Baader-Meinhof printer, novelist and playwright, Peter-Paul Zahl, build a Bertolt Brecht youth theatre after his first was destroyed in the invasion of Grenada. A central concern of the novel is to illustrate how the best intentions can go horribly wrong.

Notes

External links
Debrett's People of Today 21 August 2005
Collected reviews
Paul Pickering at Simon & Schuster USA.
Paul Pickering at Simon & Schuster UK.
Paul Pickering's website

1986 British novels
Novels by Paul Pickering
Weidenfeld & Nicolson books